Patrick Mulligan may refer to:
 Patrick Mulligan (bishop) (1912–1990), Roman Catholic Lord Bishop of Clogher in Ireland
 Patrick Mulligan (rugby union) (c. 1900–?), Australian rugby union player
 Paddy Mulligan (Patrick Martin Mulligan, born 1945), Irish footballer
 Patrick Mulligan (comics), alter ego of the comic book character Toxin